Mate Pavić and Bruno Soares defeated Wesley Koolhof and Nikola Mektić in the final, 7–5, 6–3 to win the men's doubles tennis title at the 2020 US Open. They became the first unseeded team to win the title since 2000. With the win, Pavić claimed his second major men's doubles title (after the 2018 Australian Open), and Soares won his third major men's doubles title (after the 2016 Australian and US Opens).

Juan Sebastián Cabal and Robert Farah were the defending champions, but lost in the second round to Jean-Julien Rojer and Horia Tecău.

Seeds

Draw

Finals

Top half

Bottom half

Other entry information

Wild cards

Protected ranking

External links
Main draw

Men's Doubles
US Open - Men's Doubles
US Open (tennis) by year – Men's doubles